Sigrid Behrenz (also Sigrit; born 23 January 1941) is a retired German speed skater. She competed at the 1960 Winter Olympics and finished in 18th place in the 500 m and 1000 m events. At the 1960 Winter Olympics she was 25th in 500 m. 

Personal bests:
500 m – 50.2 (1960)
 1000 m – 1:43.8 (1960)
 1500 m – 2:45.8 (1960)
 3000 m – 5:50.3 (1964)

References

1941 births
German female speed skaters
Speed skaters at the 1960 Winter Olympics
Speed skaters at the 1964 Winter Olympics
Olympic speed skaters of the United Team of Germany
Sportspeople from Prague
Living people
20th-century German women